Muharraq Airfield is a military base located adjacent to Bahrain International Airport. It is run by the United States Navy (USN) and usually ships supplies in and out of the airport with many of them from other countries as well. The USN, the United States Marine Corps (USMC), the Ministry of Interior, and others run the security at the airfield. Often referred to as the nearby city of Manama, Muharraq Airfield was the last stop for most US troops headed to join the NATO forces in Afghanistan.

It was previously established by the Royal Air Force as RAF Bahrain (later changed to RAF Muharraq) in April 1943 and remained in use until 1971 when Bahrain declared independence.

History
The Royal Air Force's history with Bahrain can be traced back to 1924, with flights originating from Shaibah Air Base in Iraq. The perceived strategic importance of Bahrain by the British led to the signing of a civil air agreement with the King of Bahrain in 1934.

The Royal Air Force established a base there in the area as RAF Bahrain on 22 May 1943, as part of RAF Iraq Command. It was later renamed RAF Muharraq in 1963. The base was formally shut down on 15 December 1971. The base was also used by Air Forces Gulf Communication Squadron RAF. Search and Rescue Flight RAF, Muharraq was based there from the mid-sixties to 1971.

The base was used by a detachment of Vickers VC10 tankers from No. 101 Squadron RAF during the Gulf War training with Royal Air Force Panavia Tornado GR1's.

From May 1997 a detachment of VC10's returned supporting Operation Jural and later Operation Bolton over Iraq. It became part of No. 83 Expeditionary Air Group in the Middle East. Commanded by a Squadron Leader (RAF) until 2015, the current ranking Officer is a Warrant Officer First Class (Supply Chain) RN.

References

Citations

Bibliography

Airfields of the United States Navy
Military installations of Bahrain